The Tiger Cub Economies collectively refer to the economies of the developing countries of Indonesia, Malaysia, the Philippines, Thailand and Vietnam, the five dominant countries in Southeast Asia.

Overview
The Tiger Cub Economies are so named because they attempt to follow the same export-driven model of technology and economic development already achieved by the rich, high-tech, industrialized, and developed countries of South Korea and Taiwan, along with the wealthy financial centers of Hong Kong and Singapore, which are all collectively referred to as the Four Asian Tigers. Young tigers are referred to as "cubs", the implication being that the five newly industrialized countries who make up the Tiger Cub Economies are rising Tigers. In fact, four countries are included in HSBC's list of top 50 economies in 2050, while Indonesia, Vietnam and the Philippines are included in Goldman Sachs's Next Eleven list of high potential economies because of their rapid growth and large population.

Overseas Chinese entrepreneurs played a major prominent role in the development of the region's private sectors. These businesses are part of the larger bamboo network, a network of overseas Chinese businesses operating in the markets of developing countries like Malaysia, Indonesia, Thailand, and the Philippines that share common family and cultural ties. China's transformation into a major economic power in the 21st century has led to increasing investments in Southeast Asian countries where the bamboo network is present.

2020 data
GDP and GDP per capita data are according to World Bank's July 2020 data.

Economies of Southeast Asia

Developing economies of the Tiger Cubs 
 Economy of Indonesia
 Economy of Malaysia
 Economy of the Philippines
 Economy of Thailand
 Economy of Vietnam

Developed economies of the Four Asian Tigers 
 Economy of Singapore
 Economy of Hong Kong
 Economy of South Korea
 Economy of Taiwan

See also 
Flying geese paradigm
Lee Kuan Yew
1997 Asian financial crisis
Miracle on the Han River
Taiwan Miracle
Four Asian Tigers

References 

Tiger economies
Economic booms
Late modern economic history
Economy of Southeast Asia
Economy of Indonesia
Economy of Malaysia
Economy of the Philippines
Economy of Thailand
Economy of Vietnam